Trichodes longissimus is a beetle species of checkered beetles belonging to the family Cleridae, subfamily Clerinae. It was described by Abeille in 1881 and is endemic to Cyprus.

References

longissimus
Beetles described in 1881
Endemic fauna of Cyprus
Taxa named by Elzéar Abeille de Perrin